Verkhnyaya Katukhovka is a rural locality (a settlement) in Ivanovskoye Rural Settlement, Paninsky District, Voronezh Oblast, Russia. The population was 447 as of 2010. There are 5 streets.

Geography 
Verkhnyaya Katukhovka is located on the Pravaya Khava River, 15 km northwest of Panino (the district's administrative centre) by road. Trudolyubovka is the nearest rural locality.

References 

Rural localities in Paninsky District